Wave is a company that provides financial services and software for small businesses. Wave is headquartered in the East Bayfront neighborhood in Toronto, Canada.

The company's first product was a free online accounting software designed for businesses with 19 employees, followed by invoicing, personal finance and receipt-scanning software (OCR). In 2012, Wave began branching into financial services, initially with Payments by Wave (credit card processing) and Payroll by Wave, followed by Lending by Wave in February 2017 which has since been discontinued.

Features and integrations
The company's initial product, Accounting by Wave, is a double entry accounting tool. Services include direct bank data imports, invoicing and expense tracking, customizable chart of accounts, and journal transactions. Accounting by Wave integrates with expense tracking software Shoeboxed, and e-commerce website Etsy.

The next product launched was Payroll by Wave, which was launched in 2012 after the acquisition of SmallPayroll.ca. Payroll by Wave is only available in the U.S.A. and Canada.

Invoicing by Wave is an offshoot of the company's earlier accounting tools.

Additional products launched on or shortly after the company's rebrand in December 2012 include:
 a credit card processing tool, Payments by Wave, built initially on integration with Stripe credit card processing. However Wave does not report merchant fees correctly for countries where Stripe charges a tax such as GST. In these cases the merchant fees are reported without tax and do not match your Stripe account. 
 a receipt scanning tool, Receipts by Wave.

In 2017, Wave signed an agreement to provide its platform on RBC's online business banking site. The RBC-Wave service will be co-branded.

Taxes supported 

Wave currently supports adding custom taxes via settings. However you must manually apply the tax for every transaction as they come in, there is no way to automate it.

It currently only supports tax-exclusive pricing, such U.S. sales tax, where taxes are added on top of prices quoted. This has two effects:

 When scanning receipts you must manually add the tax, and input the tax amount.
 When making an invoice, you must put in a price before tax, and it will add the tax on top.

This makes Wave unable to handle taxes in countries like Australia where prices must be quoted inclusive of all taxes such as GST. There is no way to set an invoice total and have Wave calculate the tax portion as a percentage.  This is not a problem for businesses that deal in wholesale transactions that are not subject to sales tax, but is problematic for retail businesses whose pricing includes GST.

Pricing and business model
Wave provides its software for free.

Revenue from the company comes from the paid financial services the company offers:
 Payments by Wave: Card Processing which includes Debit, Credit and Prepaid Cards as well as ACH (Bank Payments) - Fees are a percentage of the transaction.
 Payroll by Wave: Monthly subscription fee plus usage fees.

Wave previously included advertising on its pages as a source of revenue. Advertising was removed in January 2017.

Wave's software is free, as opposed to freemium, in that the tools can be used without tiers or limits indefinitely.

Wave does not currently disclose its revenue or financial statements publicly. However, media reports in 2016 indicated annual revenues of $20 million at that time. In 2017 Wave raised $24m (USD) in funding led by NAB Ventures.

History
CEO Kirk Simpson and CPO James Lochrie launched Wave Accounting Inc. in July 2009. Wave Accounting launched to the public on November 16, 2010.  In June 2011 Series A funding led by OMERS Ventures was closed. In September 2011, FedDev Ontario invested one million dollars in funding. In October 2011, a $5-million investment led by U.S. venture capital firm Charles River Ventures was announced. In May 2012, Wave Accounting closed its series B financing round led by The Social+Capital Partnership, with follow-on participation from Charles River Ventures and OMERS Ventures.
 
Wave acquired a company called Small Payroll in November 2011, which was later launched as a payroll product called Wave Payroll. In February 2012, Wave officially launched Wave Payroll to the public in Canada, followed by the American release in November of the same year.

In August, 2012, the company announced the acquisition of Vuru.co, an online stock-tracking service. Terms of the deal were not disclosed.

In December 2012 the company rebranded itself as Wave to emphasize its broadened spectrum of services.

On March 14, 2019 the company acquired Every, a Toronto-based fintech company that provides business accounts and debit cards to small businesses.

On June 11, 2019, the company announced it was being acquired by tax preparation company, H&R Block, for $537 million.

Beginning in the Spring of 2020, the Wave app was only intermittently able to connect to RBC Royal Bank accounts in Canada.

On June 15, 2022, Wave announced that Kirk Simpson would be leaving and being replaced as CEO by Zahir Khoja.

See also
 Accounting software
 Comparison of accounting software
 List of free and open-source software packages
 Web application

External links 

 official website

References

Accounting software
Cloud applications
Proprietary software
Software companies of Canada
Web applications